Sally L. McArthur is an Australian materials scientist who is Professor of Biomedical Engineering at Swinburne University of Technology and Research Scientist at CSIRO. Her research considers the development of novel biomaterials for biomedical, nutritional and environmental applications. She was elected Fellow of the Australian Academy of Technology and Engineering in 2021.

Early life and education 
McArthur was an undergraduate student in biomedical and materials engineering at Monash University. She moved to Sydney for graduate research, working toward a doctorate at the University of New South Wales. McArthur completed a postdoc at the University of Washington. In 2002, she started her independent academic career at the University of Sheffield.

Research and career 
McArthur makes use of biomedical engineering to improve human wellbeing. In 2008, she joined Swinburne University of Technology, where she focused on research-led innovation and tech translation. For example, her research informed the design of extended wear contact lenses, which was licensed to CIBA Vision. She also created a scalable chemical oxygen demand sensing system that can provide accurate results in fifteen minutes without the use of harmful chemicals.

At CSIRO, McArthur develops 3D cell culture systems that can permit in situ sensing and imaging. Her laboratory is home to the Australian National Fabrication Facilities, a space which provides surface engineering capabilities to researchers across academia and industry. She was awarded the BioMelbourne Network Most Valuable Women in Leadership Award in 2016.

In 2021, McArthur was elected Fellow of the Australian Academy of Science. She became Director of the Institute for Frontier Materials at Deakin University in 2022.

McArthur joined the American Vacuum Society in 2000. She was appointed to the Executive Committee of the Division for Biomaterial Interfaces in 2005 and made Division Chair in 2011. She has served as editor of Biointerphases since 2017. She was elected a Trustee of the American Vacuum Society in 2021.

Selected publications

References 

Living people
Australian materials scientists
Australian women scientists
University of New South Wales alumni
Academic staff of Swinburne University of Technology
Fellows of the Australian Academy of Technological Sciences and Engineering
Year of birth missing (living people)